The Boardman River Nature Center is a nature center in Traverse City, Michigan.  It is operated by the Grand Traverse Conservation District, a regional parkland authority.  The nature center is dedicated to educating residents of Grand Traverse County about the animals and plants of the area, especially those native to the Boardman River valley.

Description
The Nature Center serves as the interpretive center and management headquarters for the Grand Traverse Natural Education Reserve, a 505-acre local park and natural area.  The Conservation District reports that the Reserve contains Northern Michigan woodlands and wetlands.  Local fauna center on small game of varieties once harvested in the local fur trade, including whitetail deer, red fox, mink, and otter.  A segment of flowing water is often dammed by a family of beaver to create an active beaver pond.  

The park reserve features ponds and wetlands of the Boardman River above Boardman Lake.  7 miles of trails give visitors access to the resources of the Reserve.

References

Buildings and structures in Grand Traverse County, Michigan
Protected areas of Grand Traverse County, Michigan
Traverse City, Michigan
Nature centers in Michigan
Education in Grand Traverse County, Michigan